John Frederick "Johnny" Mautz (born September 19, 1970) is a Republican member of the Maryland Senate. Mautz previously served in the Maryland House of Delegates, representing District 37B, based in Caroline, Dorchester, Talbot, and Wicomico Counties, Maryland, from 2015 to 2023 alongside fellow Republican Christopher T. Adams.

Personal life and career
Mautz was born on September 19, 1970 in Fort Devens, Massachusetts. He graduated from Brewster Academy in Wolfeboro, New Hampshire, and received a B.A. degree in political science from the University of Dayton in 1994 and a J.D. degree from the Claude W. Pettit College of Law in 1997.

Before serving in the Maryland House of Delegates, Mautz served as a counsel on the United States House Committee on the Judiciary from 1997 to 2002. Afterwards, he served as a Special Assistant to the Deputy Chief of Staff for Governor Bob Ehrlich from 2002 to 2005, and as legislative director for U.S. Representative Howard Coble (R-NC) from 2009 to 2014.

Mautz is married and has two children. He owns the Carpenter Street Saloon in Saint Michaels, Maryland.

In the legislature
Mautz was elected to the House of Delegates in the 2014 General Assembly elections, succeeding delegates Adelaide Eckardt and Jeannie Haddaway. He was sworn in on January 14, 2015.

In March 2018, Mautz voted against the Reform on Tap Act of 2018, which would have repealed certain limits on micro-breweries, farm breweries, and limited beer wholesalers.

In April 2018, Mautz voted in favor of House Bill 888, which restricts the sale and possession of bump stocks, and House Bill 1302, which authorizes a person to petition for an extreme risk prevention order with a court or law enforcement agency when it may be determined that a person is either an extreme risk to himself or to others. Following the vote, Mautz issued a written apology to his constituents, saying that he had not read the bills and intended to vote against them. Governor Larry Hogan would sign HB 1302 into law, but vetoed HB 888.

In January 2020, Mautz voted against overriding Hogan's veto on House Bill 720, which establishes a consensus-based process to create a new oyster fishery management plan for the state involving environmentalists, watermen and seafood sellers, citing concerns that the bill could cause economic harm to communities on the Chesapeake Bay.

In March 2021, Mautz voted against the Maryland Driver Privacy Act (HB 23), which would prohibit state and local government agencies from providing records or data to U.S. Immigration and Customs Enforcement for the purpose of civil immigration enforcement, insisting that the bill extended extra protections to undocumented immigrants with drivers' licenses.

In February 2022, after much speculation, Mautz filed to run for Maryland Senate, challenging Adelaide Eckardt in the primary. He defeated Eckardt in the Republican primary on July 19, and won the general election on November 8, 2022.

Committee assignments
 Economic Matters Committee, 2015–present (banking, economic development, science and technology subcommittee, 2015–2018; public utilities subcommittee, 2015–present; workers' compensation subcommittee, 2015–present; banking, consumer protection and commercial law subcommittee, 2019–present; joint electric universal service program work group, 2020–present)
 Study Group on Economic Stability, 2019–present
 Joint Electric Universal Service Program Work Group, 2020–present

Other memberships
 House Chair, Talbot County Delegation, 2015–present
 Maryland Legislative Sportsmen's Caucus, 2015–present
 Maryland Veterans Caucus, 2015–present

Electoral history

References

External links
 

Republican Party members of the Maryland House of Delegates
Living people
1970 births
People from Massachusetts
21st-century American politicians
Republican Party Maryland state senators